Mlynky is a village and municipality in the Spišská Nová Ves District in the Košice Region of central-eastern Slovakia. It is one of the most important touristic localities around Slovak Karst. Locals make their living mostly from tourism.

History
In village grew up around 1850.

Geography
The village lies at an altitude of 739 metres and covers an area of 25.051 km².
In 2011 had a population of 581 inhabitants.

External links
Official homepage
http://www.statistics.sk/mosmis/eng/run.html
http://en.e-obce.sk/obec/mlynky/mlynky.html

Villages and municipalities in Spišská Nová Ves District